ADOdb Lite is a very small, fast ADOdb-compatible database abstraction library written in PHP. 

It uses less than 100 kB of system RAM for each HTTP access compared to over 640 kB for ADOdb. After a benchmark ADOdb Lite is also 300% faster than the ADOdb library.

Supported databases
 FrontBase
 Gladius
 MaxDB
 Mini SQL	
 MS SQL
 MS SQL Pro
 MySQL
 MySQL Improved
 MySQL w/transactions
 PostgreSQL
 SQLite
 SQLite Pro
 Sybase
 Sybase ASE

The ADOdb Lite library is fully expandable through the use of modules.  The library contains a PEAR module that contains PEAR DB-compatible commands.  The library also contains a Transaction module giving full transaction support to many of the supported databases.  The library can support any number of user created modules to easily expand the library.  The module system also gives the programmer/admin the ability to structure the library usage based upon the needs of the website.

The library is very fast compared to other database abstraction libraries.

External links
Official site

Data access technologies